This is a list of the number-one downloaded songs in Canada during the year 2013.

The Nielsen SoundScan-compiled chart is published on Music Canada's website every Wednesday.

Chart history

See also
List of Hot 100 number-one singles of 2013 (Canada)
List of number-one digital songs of 2011 (Canada)
List of number-one digital songs of 2012 (Canada)
List of number-one digital songs of 2014 (Canada)

References

External links
Current Hot Digital Canadian Songs

Canada Digital Songs
Digital 2013
2013 in Canadian music